Hit & Run is an Israeli-American Netflix original thriller television series, created and written by Avi Issacharoff, Lior Raz, Dawn Prestwich, and Nicole Yorkin. The series premiered on 6 August 2021. In September 2021, the series was canceled after one season.

Synopsis 
Hit and Run centers on a happily married man, Segev Azulai, whose life is turned upside down when his wife is killed in a mysterious hit and run accident in Tel Aviv. Grief-stricken and confused, he searches for his wife’s killers, who have fled to the U.S. With the help of an ex-lover, Naomi Hicks, he uncovers disturbing truths about his beloved wife and the secrets she kept from him.

Episodes

Cast

Production and distribution 
Hit & Run was written by Avi Issacharoff, Lior Raz, Dawn Prestwich, and Nicole Yorkin. Mike Barker directed the pilot and 3 other episodes; Neasa Hardiman and Rotem Shamir directed 3 and 2 episodes, respectively. This is the first Netflix original series from Israel. On 20 September 2021, Netflix canceled the series after one season.

Release 
On 12 July 2021, Netflix released the first trailer for the series. The series premiered on 6 August 2021.

Reception 
Daniel Feinberg panned the show, writing for The Hollywood Reporter that any "momentum Hit & Run builds in the early episodes - and it builds a tremendous amount - basically dissipates due to increasingly dumb narrative developments." In the Decider, Joel Keller recommends the show saying the show "boasts a fine international cast, an interesting premise, and opens up a lot of story avenues without confusing the viewer".

References

External links 
 
 
 
 

2021 American television series debuts
2021 American television series endings
2021 Israeli television series debuts
2021 Israeli television series endings
2020s American drama television series
2020s Israeli television series
English-language Netflix original programming
Hebrew-language Netflix original programming
American thriller television series
Israeli thriller television series
Television shows set in Israel